Radames or Radamés is a Hispanic masculine given name that may refer to
Radamés Gnattali (1906–1988), Brazilian composer, conductor, orchestrator, and arranger
Radamés González (born 1956), Cuban marathon runner
Radamés Martins Rodrigues da Silva (born 1986), Brazilian association football midfielder
Radames Pera (born 1960), American actor
Randy Radames Ruiz (born 1977), American baseball player
Radamés Treviño (1945–1970), Mexican cyclist